Acemya is a genus of flies in the family Tachinidae.

Species
Acemya acuticornis (Meigen, 1824)
Acemya asiatica Mesnil, 1963
Acemya favilla Reinhard, 1974
Acemya fishelsoni Kugler, 1968
Acemya indica Mesnil, 1968
Acemya oestriformis (Brauer & Bergenstamm, 1891)
Acemya plankii (Walton, 1915)
Acemya pyrrhocera (Villeneuve, 1922)
Acemya rufitibia (von Roser, 1840)
Acemya tibialis (Coquillett, 1897)

References

Taxa named by Jean-Baptiste Robineau-Desvoidy
Exoristinae
Tachinidae genera
Diptera of Asia
Diptera of Europe
Diptera of North America